Vinograd is a village in Strazhitsa Municipality, Veliko Tarnovo Province, Bulgaria.

Villages in Veliko Tarnovo Province